Prince Aimone of Savoy-Aosta, 6th Duke of Aosta (Aimone Umberto Emanuele Filiberto Luigi Amedeo Elena Maria Fiorenzo di Savoia-Aosta; born 13 October 1967) is one of two claimants to be head of the House of Savoy.  Since November 2019, he has served as the Ambassador of the Sovereign Military Order of Malta to Russia.

Education and career
Aimone was born in Florence the second child and only son of Prince Amedeo of Savoy, Duke of Aosta and his first wife, Princess Claude of Orléans. Aimone attended the Francesco Morosini Naval Military School and Bocconi University. After he completed his education, Aimone worked at JPMorgan Chase in the United Kingdom. He also served a period in the Italian Navy's special forces (see Comando Raggruppamento Subacquei e Incursori Teseo Tesei).

Beginning in 2000, Aimone was the president of Pirelli operations in Russia. Since 2012, he has also served as CEO of Pirelli Tyre's Nordic division. His contribution to deepening bilateral economic relations between Italy and Russia has been recognized by the authorities of both countries, by the appointment to the Order of Friendship of Russia and the Order of Merit of the Italian Republic.

Marriage and children
Aimone's engagement to Princess Olga of Greece, daughter of Prince Michael of Greece and Denmark, was announced in May 2005. Olga and Aimone are second cousins; both being great-grandchildren of the French pretender Prince Jean, Duke of Guise. They are also second cousins-once-removed, as George I of Greece is Olga's patrilineal great-grandfather and Aimone's great-great-grandfather. Several falsely reported wedding dates marked what was to become a three-year engagement. The couple finally wed on 16 September 2008 at the Italian embassy in Moscow, the city in which Aimone is employed. Their religious marriage took place on 27 September 2008 at Patmos.

Aimone and Olga have three children, two sons and one daughter:
 Prince Umberto of Savoy-Aosta, born on 7 March 2009 in Neuilly-sur-Seine, France. On 9 March 2009, Prince Umberto was granted the title Prince of Piedmont by his paternal grandfather. Upon his grandfather's death he became heir apparent to the Dukedom.
 Prince Amedeo Michele of Savoy-Aosta, born on 24 May 2011 in Neuilly-sur-Seine, France. A day after his birth Amedeo was granted the title Duke of the Abruzzi by his paternal grandfather. 
 Princess Isabella Vita Marina of Savoy-Aosta, born on 14 December 2012 in Paris, France. She was named in honor of Princess Isabelle of Orléans.

Dynastic issues
From his birth, Aimone was known as Duke of Apulia (duca delle Puglie).

On 7 July 2006, Aimone's father, Prince Amedeo, Duke of Aosta, claimed the headship of the House of Savoy and the title Duke of Savoy, in opposition to his cousin Vittorio Emanuele, Prince of Naples. Amedeo defined Aimone as Duke of Aosta "in pectore".

References

1967 births
Dukes of Aosta
Dukes of Apulia
Pretenders to the Italian throne
Bocconi University alumni
Italian princes
Nobility from Florence
Princes of Savoy
Italian people of Danish descent
Italian people of Greek descent
Knights of Malta
Knights of the Order of Merit of the Italian Republic
Living people